Suponevo is a rural locality (a selo) and the administrative center of Suponevskoye Rural Settlement, Bryansky District, Bryansk Oblast, Russia. Population:   8,585 (2010). There are 96 streets.

Geography 
Suponevo is located 25 km southeast of Glinishchevo (the district's administrative centre) by road. Antonovka is the nearest rural locality.

References 

Rural localities in Bryansky District
Bryansky Uyezd